Si Lanna National Park is a national park in Chiang Mai Province, Thailand. Home to waterfalls, caves and springs, this mountainous park is the source of numerous tributaries of the Ping River.

Geography
The park's area is 878,557 rai ~ . The  Mae Ngat Somboon Chon Reservoir lies within the park.

History
On 1 August 1989, Si Lanna was designated Thailand's 60th National Park. This national park is home to hill tribes including Karen and Lahu.

Attractions
Mon Hin Lai Waterfall is a nine-tiered waterfall located in the Mae Ngat Forest. Other waterfalls include Huai Mae Rangong and Huai Pa Phlu. The Nong Pha cave system features stalactites and stalagmites.

Flora and fauna
The park's rugged terrain features numerous forest types: mixed deciduous, moist evergreen, hill evergreen and dipterocarp. Tree species include Tectona grandis, Pterocarpus macrocarpus, Dalbergia oliveri, Hopea odorata, Shorea obtusa, Dipterocarpus obtusifolius, Dipterocarpus tuberculatus, Irvingia malayana, Xylia xylocarpa, Cinnamomum iners, Toona ciliata, Lagerstroemia calyculata and Shorea siamensis.

Animal species include tiger, Asian black bear, sambar deer, northern red muntjac, macaque, Siamese hare and wild boar. Bird life includes coucal, bulbul, barbet, little egret and lesser whistling-duck.

See also
List of national parks of Thailand
List of Protected Areas Regional Offices of Thailand

References

National parks of Thailand
Geography of Chiang Mai province
Tourist attractions in Chiang Mai province
1989 establishments in Thailand
Protected areas established in 1989